MV Seymour Castle is a river boat sailing for Thames River Cruises of Reading, England as the MV Devon Belle. She is registered by National Historic Ships on the National Register of Historic Vessels, certificate number 1955, and is one of the surviving "Little ships of Dunkirk" from the Dunkirk evacuation in 1940.

Design
MV Seymour Castle was built to a typical river boat design, with a lower deck, fully enclosed saloon with bar and an open deck above, fitted with a canopy.  The large forward open deck, and small open deck at the stern are around half way between the two levels.  The wheelhouse is located on the upper deck. She was built with large windows for the full length of her lower saloon.  These were replaced with rather small portholes during her time as the MV Scomber, but were restored during her time as Dartmothian.

History
Built for the River Dart Steamboat Co Ltd by Ferris and Blank of Creekside Boatyard near Dartmouth, Devon.  She was the largest vessel ever built by this yard, which specialised in the construction of motor yachts and rowing boats, and was built of local oak frames, with pitch pine planking. She only had one year in service before the declaration of World War II.  In May 1940 she travelled to the Dover Straits to assist in the Dunkirk Evacuation, and remained in Admiralty service in the Folkestone area until the end of the war, when she returned to the Dart.

In 1972, with reducing traffic on the Dart, she was sold to the naturalist and writer Tony Soper, who gave her a major refit, with a new wheelhouse, portholes replacing her cabin windows and a saloon equipped for lectures.  She was also equipped with beam trawl, plankton nets, charts, books and microscopes for passenger use.  She was used on wildlife spotting cruises from Plymouth and Dartmouth, including a number of six-day cruises under charter to the National Trust, with passengers spending nights ashore in hotels.  In 1977 she returned to conventional cruises, based out of Plymouth, for KT Bridge, under the name MV Southern Comfort of Plymstock.

In 1982 she returned to the Dart, under the ownership of G.H. Riddalls and Sons, was renamed MV Dartmothian, and resumed her Dartmouth to Totnes sailings and circular cruises from Dartmouth.  Following the introduction of the MV Dartmouth Princess in 1994 and the MV Dittisham Princess in 1995 she saw little use, and was sold to KJ Bridge, and renamed the MV Devon Belle, resuming the "dockyard and warships" cruises from Plymouth Hoe.

In 1999 MV Devon Belle was sold to Thames River Cruises of Caversham, Berkshire, near Reading on the River Thames.  She underwent a major restoration, during which she returned to Dunkirk as part of the 2000 Dunkirk reunion. She now operates trips to Mapledurham House and circular cruises.

References

External links
 Thames River Cruises Website

1938 ships
Ferries of South West England
Little Ships of Dunkirk
Ships and vessels on the National Register of Historic Vessels
River Dart passenger vessels